= Buffalo International Jewish Film Festival =

- Location: Buffalo, New York, U.S.
- Established: 1985

The Buffalo International Jewish Film Festival is the third oldest continuously running annual festival of its kind in the United States, as of 2024. It was founded in 1985 in Buffalo, New York.
